Typocerus lunulatus is a species of flower longhorn beetle of the family Cerambycidae. It is found in North America.

Subspecies
These two subspecies belong to the species Typocerus lunulatus:
 Typocerus lunulatus lunulatus (Swederus, 1787)
 Typocerus lunulatus texanus Linsley & Chemsak, 1976 (Texas stallingia beetle)

References

Further reading

 

Lepturinae
Articles created by Qbugbot
Beetles described in 1787